The 2017 Dallas Cup, known as the Dr Pepper Dallas Cup for sponsorship reasons, was the thirty-eighth edition of a youth football competition held in the United States. Competitions were held at every age from U-13 to U-19. The U-19 level also had an additional competition for elite teams, known as the Gordon Jago Supergroup.

Gordon Jago Supergroup

Participants

Sources:Dallas Cup

Matches

Group A

Group B

Group C

Knockout stage

Semi-finals

Final

Media coverage

References

External links
Dallas Cup website

Dallas Cup
Dallas Cup
Dallas Cup